Desiderio Michele Garufo (born 22 April 1987) is an Italian professional footballer who plays for amateur side Canicattì.

Biography
Born in Grotte, Sicily, Garufo started his career at Nissa. He won Eccellenza Sicily with team in 2008 (Italian sixth level until 2014). Garufo scored 10 goals in 2008–09 Serie D, Italian fifth level and top level of amateur football. In 2009 Garufo was signed by Lega Pro 2nd Division club Sangiovannese (Italian fourth level). The club was the losing side of the promotion playoffs. Garufo was a substitute and starting right midfielder in 4-3-2-1 formation respectively.

Taranto
Garufo moved to Italian third level for Taranto in 2010. The club entered the promotion playoffs, losing to Atletico Roma. Garufo was the wingback in the 3-4-3 formation in the first leg.

Garufo remained for the club for 2011–12 season. However the club folded despite finished as the losing side of promotion playoffs again.

Nocerina
On 3 July 2012, he was signed by another third division club Nocerina. The club also finished as the losing side of promotion playoffs of 2012–13 L.P. Prime Div. season. Garufo was the right-back and right midfielder respectively in 4-3-3 formation in the first and second legs.

Trapani
On 1 July 2013, Garufo was signed by Serie B club Trapani on a free transfer. He wore the number 2 shirt. Garufo made his competitive debut for the club in Italian Cup as right-back.

Novara
On 1 August 2014, Garufo was signed by Lega Pro club Novara Calcio in a two-year contract. After the club promoted to Serie B, Garufo wore the number 17 shirt, the traditional back luck number. He did not play in the opening match of 2015–16 Serie B. On 16 September he was sold back to Lega Pro, the third division of Italian football pyramid.

Catania
On 16 September 2015, Garufo and Bergamelli were sold to Catania in two-year contracts. He played 23 games for the club in Lega Pro C, contributing with 4 assists. He also featured in one game in the Italian Cup.

Parma
On 13 July 2016, Garufo was signed on a free transfer by Parma in a two-year contract. He was assigned the number 15 shirt. He made his debut on 7 August 2016 in a Coppa Italia Lega Pro game against Piacenza, playing as a right midfielder in a 3-5-2 formation.

Trapani
On 29 August 2018, he re-joined Trapani on a free transfer.

Reggina
On 21 August 2019, he signed a one-year contract with Reggina.

Catanzaro
On 29 September 2020, he moved to Serie C club Catanzaro. Catanzaro reported the transfer as a loan, while Reggina reported a permanent transfer.

Canicattì
On 8 October 2021, he joined an amateur side Canicattì.

References

External links
 AIC profile (data by football.it)  
 

1987 births
Living people
People from Grotte, Sicily
Italian footballers
A.S.D. Sangiovannese 1927 players
Taranto F.C. 1927 players
A.S.G. Nocerina players
Trapani Calcio players
Novara F.C. players
Catania S.S.D. players
Parma Calcio 1913 players
Reggina 1914 players
U.S. Catanzaro 1929 players
Association football fullbacks
Serie B players
Serie C players
Footballers from Sicily
Sportspeople from the Province of Agrigento